St Marie's Church may refer to:

St Marie's Church, Bury, Greater Manchester, UK
St Marie's Church, Halifax, West Yorkshire, UK
Cathedral Church of St Marie, Sheffield, South Yorkshire, UK
St Marie's Church, Widnes, Cheshire, UK
Tirana Catholic Church of St Marie, Tirana, Albania

See also
St Mary's Church (disambiguation)
St Marie (disambiguation)
Marie (disambiguation)
Saint Marie (disambiguation)
Sante Marie